Wendell Moore may refer to:

 Wendell Moore (footballer) (born 1964), Trinidadian footballer
 Wendell Moore Jr. (born 2001), American basketball player
 Wendell F. Moore (1918–1969), American engineer and inventor